The Grammy Award for Best Solo Rock Vocal Performance was an award presented at the Grammy Awards, a ceremony that was established in 1958 and originally called the Gramophone Awards, to recording artists for works (songs or albums) containing quality vocal performances in the rock music genre. Honors in several categories are presented at the ceremony annually by the National Academy of Recording Arts and Sciences of the United States to "honor artistic achievement, technical proficiency and overall excellence in the recording industry, without regard to album sales or chart position".

Originally called the Grammy Award for Best Rock Vocal Performance, Solo, the award was first presented to Bruce Springsteen in 1988 for the album Tunnel of Love. Since then, the award was presented in 1992 and 1994, and has been awarded each year since 2005. Beginning with the 2005 ceremony, the name of the award was changed to Best Solo Rock Vocal Performance. For these years, the award combined and replaced the gender-specific awards for Best Male Rock Vocal Performance and Best Female Rock Vocal Performance. This fusion has been criticized, especially when females are not nominated under the solo category. The Academy has cited a lack of eligible recordings in the female rock category as the reason for the mergers.

The award was discontinued in 2012 in a major overhaul of Grammy categories. All solo or duo/group performances in the rock category are now honored in the  Best Rock Performance category. Springsteen holds the record for the most wins in this category, with five (he has also received three awards for Best Male Rock Vocal Performance). No other performing artists had received the award more than once. Neil Young holds the record for the most nominations without a win, with four.

Recipients

 Each year is linked to the article about the Grammy Awards held that year.
 Award was separated into the gender-specific awards for Best Rock Vocal Performance, Male and Best Rock Vocal Performance, Female.

See also

 American rock
 List of Grammy Award categories

References
General

  Note: User must select the "Rock" category as the genre under the search feature.
 

Specific

 
1988 establishments in the United States
2011 disestablishments in the United States
Awards disestablished in 2011
Awards established in 1988
Solo Rock Vocal Performance